Nikica Pušić-Koroljević (born 19 March 1983 in Požega) is a former Croatian team handball player. She played for the Croatian national team, and participated at the 2011 World Women's Handball Championship in Brazil, and 2012 Summer Olympics. She last played for the club RK Podravka Koprivnica.

References

External links

1983 births
Living people
Croatian female handball players
People from Požega, Croatia
Olympic handball players of Croatia
Handball players at the 2012 Summer Olympics
RK Podravka Koprivnica players